The Last Tsars (Italian:Gli ultimi zar) is a 1928 Italian silent film directed by Baldassarre Negroni and starring Bartolomeo Pagano, Elena Lunda and Amilcare Taglienti.

Cast
 Bartolomeo Pagano as Maciste  
 Elena Lunda 
 Amilcare Taglienti 
 Franz Sala 
 Sandro Ruffini 
 Elizabeth Grey 
 Alberto Pasquali 
 Augusto Bandini 
 Andrea Miano 
 Felice Minotti

References

Bibliography
Moliterno, Gino. The A to Z of Italian Cinema. Scarecrow Press, 2009.

External links

1928 films
1920s Italian-language films
Films directed by Baldassarre Negroni
Italian silent feature films
Italian black-and-white films